Goalball at the 1984 Summer Paralympics consisted of men's and women's team events.

Medal summary

References 

 

1984 Summer Paralympics events
1984
Goalball in the United States